The Codex Athous Laurae, designated by Ψ or 044 (in the Gregory-Aland numbering of New Testament manuscripts), or δ 6 (in the von Soden numbering of New Testament Manuscripts), is a manuscript of the New Testament written in Greek uncial letters on parchment. The manuscript has many gaps in the text, as well as containing handwritten notes (known as marginalia). Using the study of comparative writing styles (palaeographically), the codex is dated  to the 8th or 9th century.

The codex is currently kept in the Great Lavra monastery (B' 52) on the Athos peninsula.

Description 
The manuscript is a codex (precursor to the modern book), containing 261 parchment leaves, which measure , with the text-block being . The text is written in small uncial letters, in one column of 31 lines per page. These letters have breathings (utilised to designate vowel emphasis) and accents (used to indicate voiced pitch changes). The codex contains a table of contents ("" / kephalaia) before each book, the Ammonian Sections and Eusebian Canons (an early system of dividing the four Gospels into different sections), lectionary notes in the margin (for liturgical use), musical notes (neumes), and subscriptions. It is considered one of the oldest manuscripts with musical notes.

 Textual overview
The codex originally contained the entire New Testament except for the Book of Revelation, with several gaps at both the beginning and end. The Gospel of Matthew, the Gospel of Mark 1:1-9:4, and one leaf from the Hebrews with text 8:11-9:19 have subsequently been lost.

The order of the codex's books are as follows:

 the four Gospels
 the Acts of the Apostles
 the General epistles
 the Pauline epistles

The General epistles are in an unusual order (1-2 Peter, James, 1-3 John, and Jude; James usually comes before 1 Peter).  There is also a shorter ending to the Gospel of Mark before the longer version. This is similar to the ending found in other Greek New Testament manuscripts, such as Codex Regius and all other Greek codices in which the general epistles appear.

History 
The manuscript was seen by biblical scholar C. R. Gregory on August 26, 1886. He described it as the first of its kind. In 1892, the biblical scholar J. Rendel Harris didn't examine the codex even though he was on a visit to Mount Athos, as he was only inspecting the Septuagint (a early Greek translation of the Old Testament) manuscripts there. Von Goltz and Protestant theologian Georg Wobbermin had collated the text of Acts, the general epistles, and Pauline epistles for biblical scholar Hermann von Soden. The codex was examined by biblical scholar Kirsopp Lake in 1899, who thoroughly examined the Gospel of Mark and collated the text of the gospels of Luke and John. He did not examine the text of Acts and the epistles because, according to Soden, their text was ordinary. In 1903, Lake published the text of the Gospel of Mark 9:5-16:20, and a collation of the gospels of Luke, John, and the Epistle to the Colossians in Studia Biblica et Ecclesiastica.

Textual variants 
The Greek text of this codex is described as representative of the Byzantine text-type, but with a large portion of Alexandrian readings, as well as some Western readings. The text-types are groups of different manuscripts which share specific or generally related readings, which then differ from each other group, and thus the conflicting readings can separate out the groups, which are then used to determine the original text as published; there are three main groups with names: Alexandrian, Western, and Byzantine.

Despite being an unusually mixed text, Von Soden lists it as generally Alexandrian due to the Gospel of Mark and the General Epistles being mostly in-line with the Alexandrian text-type. In the Gospel of Luke and John, the Byzantine element is predominate, but with a larger proportion of Alexandrian readings than in Codex Sangallensis 48. The text of the General Epistles appeared to be the same type as found in Codex Alexandrinus, Minuscule 33, Minuscule 81, and Minuscule 436. Biblical scholar Kurt Aland placed the text of the codex in Category III in the Gospels, Acts, Pauline Epistles, and its text of the General Epistles in Category II of his New Testament manuscript text classification system. Category III manuscripts are described as having "a small but not a negligible proportion of early readings, with a considerable encroachment of [Byzantine] readings, and significant readings from other sources as yet unidentified", and Category II manuscripts as those "of a special quality, i.e., manuscripts with a considerable proportion of the early text, but which are marked by alien influences. These influences are usually of smoother, improved readings, and in later periods by infiltration by the Byzantine text."

 Some textual variants

  (and every sacrifice shall be consumed) - Ψ
  (and every sacrifice salted with salt) - Majority of manuscripts
 omit. - B L Δ 0274 ƒ ƒ 28* 700 sy sa bo.

  (and be joined to his wife)
 omit. – Ψ  B 892 ℓ 48 sy goth
 incl. - Majority of manuscripts

  (do not defraud)
 omit. - Ψ B K W Δ ƒ ƒ 28 579 700 1010 1079 1242 1546 2148 ℓ 10 ℓ 950 ℓ 1642 ℓ 1761 sy arm geo
 incl. - B Majority of manuscripts

  (the beloved, in Whom I am well pleased) – Ψ C D ℓ 19 ℓ 31 ℓ 47 ℓ 48 ℓ 49 ℓ 49 ℓ 183 ℓ 183 ℓ 211
  (the chosen) –    B L Ξ 892 1241
  (the beloved) – Majority of manuscripts

  (eternal life) – Ψ  C D L 0100 ƒ it vg sy sa bo
  (eternal life) - Majority of manuscripts

  (from Jerusalem) – Ψ D 181 436 614 2412 ℓ 147 ℓ 809 ℓ 1021 ℓ 1141 ℓ 1364 ℓ 1439 ar d gig vg Chrysostom
  (to Jerusalem) –  B H L P 049 056 0142 81 88 326 330 451 629 1241 1505 1877 2492 2495 Majority of manuscripts Lect
  (from Jerusalem) –  A 33 69 630 2127
  (to Antioch) – 97 110 328 424 425
  (to Antioch) – ℓ 38
  (from Jerusalem to Antioch) – E 322 323
  (from Jerusalem to Antioch) – 429 945 1739 e p sy sa geo
  (to Jerusalem to Antioch) – 104 sa

  (with a written letter by their hand, having the following contents:) - Ψ
  (being written by their hand) –   * A B bo
  (having written this by their hand) –  E (33) Majority of manuscripts sy
  (having written by their hand a letter, containing this:) – C ar c gig w geo
  (having written a letter by their hand, containing this:) – D d
  (having written a letter by their hand, and sent it containing this:) – 614

  (the way of God) – Ψ P 049 0142 104 330 451 1241 1877 2127 2492 Majority of manuscripts Lect
  (the way of God) –   A B 33 614 1175 vg

  (remaining within Gullion. On the next day) - Ψ
  (and remained in Trogyllium, on the next day) - Majority of manuscripts
  (and on the next day) -    A B C E 33 453 1175 1739 1891 2818 vg bo

Acts 20:28
  (of the Lord) – Ψ  A C* D E 33 36 453 945 1739 1891
  (of God) -  B 614 1175 1505 vg sy bo; Cyr
  (of the Lord and God) - C Majority of manuscripts

  (Gauda) – Ψ 
  (Kauda) –  𝔓74  B 1175 lat sy
  (Klauda) –  * A 33 81 614 945 1505 1739 vg sy
  (Klaudan) –  L 323. 1241 Majority of manuscripts

  (And when he had said these words, the Jews departed and had a great dispute among themselves)
 omit. – Ψ    A B E 048 33 81 1175 1739 2464
 incl. - Majority of manuscripts

  (of Jesus, not living according to [the] flesh) – Ψ A D Minuscule 81 629 2127 vg
  (of Jesus) –  B D G 1739 1881 it sa bo eth
  (of Jesus, not living according to [the] flesh, but according to [the] Spirit) –  D K P 33 88 104 181 326 330 (436 omit μη) 456 614 630 1241 1877 1962 1984 1985 2492 2495 Majority of manuscripts Lect

 insert after  – Ψ L 0209 181 326 330 451 460 614 1241 1877 1881 1984 1985 2492 2495
 insert after  – 

  (witness) – Ψ B D G P 33 81 104 181 326 330 451 614 629 630 1241 1739 1877 1881 1962 1984 2127 2492 2495 Majority of manuscripts Lect it vg sy sa arm eth
  (mystery) -  * A C ar r sy bo; Hipp BasA Ambst
  (salvation) - 489 ℓ 598 ℓ 599 

  (prayer) – Ψ   * A B C D G P 6 33 81 104 181 629 630 1739 1877 1881 1962 it vg cop arm eth.
  (fasting and prayer) –  K L 365 1241 1505 Majority of manuscripts sy
  (prayer and fasting) – 230 451 JoDam 

  (gifts of healing by the one Spirit) – Ψ A B 33 81 104 436 630 (1739 omits ) 1881 it vg
  (gifts of healing by his Spirit) –  C D G K P 0201 88 181 330 451 614 629 1241 1877 1962 1984 1985 2127 2492 2495 Majority of manuscripts Lect
  (gifts of healing by the Spirit) – 
  (gifts of healing) – C

  (of God) – Ψ  A B (D*) P 33 81 104 326 365 629 1175 1241 2464
  (of [the] Lord) – F G; Cyp
 omit. -  D Majority of manuscripts r Marcion

  (God was manifest) – Ψ  A C D K L P 81 104 630. 1241. 1505. 1739. 1881 Majority of manuscripts vg
  (Who was manifest) – * A* C* F G 33 365 1175; Did Epiph 

  (indeed by them He is insulted, but by you He is glorified) – Ψ K L P 1448 1611 Majority of manuscipts it vg sy sa bo Cyp
 omit. -   A B 049 33 81 323 614 630 945 1241 1739 vg sy bo

See also 
 List of New Testament uncials
 Textual criticism
 Biblical manuscript

Notes

References

Further reading 
 Hermann von Soden, Die Schriften des Neuen Testaments in ihrer altesten erreibaren Textgestalt, I, III (Berlin, 1910), pp. 1664,-1666, 1841, 1921, 1928.
 M.-J. Lagrange, La critique rationnelle (Paris, 1935), pp. 109 f.

Greek New Testament uncials
9th-century biblical manuscripts
Athos manuscripts
Great Lavra